The Lakshmi Narasimha temple was built in 1246 CE by Bommanna Dandanayaka, a commander in the Hoysala Empire during the rule of King Vira Someshwara. It is a good example of 13th-century Hoysala architecture.  Located a short distance away in Nuggehalli, and built around the same time is the Sadashiva temple. The town was called Vijaya Somanathapura in ancient times and gained importance as an agrahara (place of learning) during the time of Bommanna Dandanayaka. Nuggehalli, (also spelled "Nuggihalli"), is a town in Hassan district of  Karnataka, India. It is located on the Tiptur-Channarayapatna state highway and is about 50 km from Hassan city. It is well connected by road with Bangalore, the state capital.

Description

This is a good example of a richly decorated Hoysala temple built in the trikuta (three towers) vimana (shrine) style with fine sculptures adorning the walls. The material used is Chloritic Schist, more commonly known as Soapstone) and the temple is built on a jagati (platform) that closely follows the plan of the temple. The size of the original temple can be considered small, to which a larger open mantapa(hall) was later added. The three shrines are located around a central closed mantapa with 9 "bays" (compartment between four pillars). The ceiling of the closed mantapa is supported by four lathe turned pillars which is deeply domed in the center. The central shrine is the most prominent one and has a large tower. This shrine has a vestibule that connects the shrine to the mantapa (hall). Consequently, the vestibule also has a tower (or superstructure, shikhara) that looks like a shorter extension of the main tower. It is called the sukanasi. According to Foekema, it looks like the "nose" of the main tower. The other two shrines have smaller towers and because they have no vestibule to connect them to the central mantapa, they have no sukanasi.

From outside, the temple actually looks like a ekakuta (single tower and shrine) temple because the two lateral shrines are simple extensions of the wall of the mantapa. Their towers are a later addition. This is a classic example of a trikuta (three shrines and towers) that looks like a ekakuta. A large open hall with tall pillars was added during later times making the original porch and closed mantapa look like the inner portion of the temple. The central shrine has five projections per side and the tower is complete though without the kalasha (decorative structure on top). Since the shrine is square in plan, the topping roof (a helmet like sculptured stone) follows the same plan. There are three tiers of decorative smaller roofs bearing their own kalasa that form the body of the main tower. The superstructure on top of the vestibule (forming the nose) has only two tiers of decorative roofs. This is why the sukanasi looks like an extension of the main tower. The two lateral shrines also have five projections per side. The top of these shrines and the wall of the mantapa are crowned with a row of decorated roofs just like the main shrine.

According to art critic Gerard Foekema, the temple is of a "newer" Hoysala style, and below the superstructure of the vimana where the roof meets the outer walls of the temple, two eaves all round the temple. The upper eaves projects about half a meter from the wall. There is a second eaves running about a meter below the upper eaves with decorative miniature towers (aedicule) between them. The wall images of Hindu gods and goddesses and their attendants are below the lower eaves, and there are 120 such sculptured panels in all. Below these are six moldings of equal size with decorations in frieze. This according to historian Kamath is broadly called "horizontal treatment". The six moldings at the base of the wall is divided into two sections. Starting from the base where the wall meets the jagati, the first horizontal lmolding contains procession of elephants, above which are a horsemen, and a band of foliage on the third. The second horizontal section starts with depictions from the Hindu epics and puranic scenes executed with detail. Above this are two friezes of yalis (or makara, an imaginary beast) and hamsas (swans). The vimana tower is divided into three horizontal sections and is even more ornate than the walls.

The images in the panels are mostly Vaishnava in faith and they are attributed to two well known Hoysala sculptors, Baichoja and Mallitamma. There are a few images of the god Shiva in the form of Bhairava along with his consort Bhairavi. Baichoja's sculptures are on the south side of the temple and according to Foekema, have a certain peace and dignity about them. Mallitamma's sculptures are on the north side. According to him, while they are not as fine, they are lively and have greater variety. The three shrines contain the images of Venugopala, Keshava and Lakshminarasimha, all avatars of Vishnu.

Gallery

See also
 Sadasiva Temple

Notes

References
 Suryanath U. Kamath (2001). A Concise History of Karnataka from pre-historic times to the present, Jupiter books, MCC, Bangalore (Reprinted 2002).  
 Gerard Foekema, A Complete Guide to Hoysala Temples, Abhinav, 1996

External links

 Nuggehalli, A haven for architecture lovers
 Nuggehalli Sri Lakshmi Narasimha Seva Samithi
 Krishna history in Frieze  
 Photos in Flickr of Nuggehalli Temple and village
 

Religious buildings and structures completed in 1246
Devi temples in Karnataka
Hindu temples in Hassan district
13th-century Hindu temples
Narasimha temples